Stygionympha robertsoni, or Robertson's brown, is a butterfly of the family Nymphalidae. It is found in South Africa, in Northern Cape, the southern part of Free State, the northern part of Western Cape and the Eastern Cape.

The wingspan is 38–40 mm. Adults are on wing from August to March. There are probably multiple generations per year.

The larvae feed on Poaceae grasses. Larvae have also been reared on Ehrharta erecta.

References

Butterflies described in 1932
Satyrini